Melody of the Plains is a 1937 American Western film directed by Sam Newfield and written by Bennett Cohen. The film stars Fred Scott, Louise Small, Al St. John, David Sharpe, Lafe McKee and Bud Jamison. The film was released on April 2, 1937, by Spectrum Pictures.

The film was a remake of Gun Law (1933).

Plot

Cast          
Fred Scott as Steve Condon
Louise Small as Molly Langley
Al St. John as Fuzzy
David Sharpe as Bud Langley
Lafe McKee as Dad Langley
Bud Jamison as Camp Cook
Billy Lenhart as Bill Langley
Slim Whitaker as Cass 
Hal Price as Gorman
Lew Meehan as Scar 
Carl Mathews as Jenks
George Fiske as Henchman 
George Morrell as Cowhand

References

External links
 

1937 films
American Western (genre) films
1937 Western (genre) films
Films directed by Sam Newfield
American black-and-white films
1930s English-language films
1930s American films